Cystiscus bougei is a species of very small sea snail, a marine gastropod mollusk or micromollusk in the family Cystiscidae.

Description
The size of the shell attains 1.45 mm.

Distribution
This marine species occurs off New Caledonia.

References

 Boyer F., 2003. The Cystiscidae (Caenogastropoda) from upper reef formations of New Caledonia. Iberus 21(1): 241-272.

Cystiscidae
Gastropods described in 1917
Bougei